Hypselobarbus menoni is a species of cyprinid in the genus Hypselobarbus.

References

External links
Fishbase profile

Cyprinidae
Cyprinid fish of Asia
Fish of India
Endangered fish
Fish described in 2014